Jiaoliao or Jiao–Liao Mandarin is a primary dialect of Mandarin Chinese, spoken on the Jiaodong Peninsula, from Yantai to Qingdao, Ganyu District in northeastern Jiangsu and the Liaodong Peninsula, from Dalian to Dandong, and in Mishan, Hulin, Fuyuan & Raohe counties of Heilongjiang. Yantai, Dalian, and Weihai dialects are the standard Jiao–Liao Mandarin.

Etymology
Jiao is short for the Jiao River. Liao is short for the Liaodong Peninsula, and the name Liaodong means "East of the Liao River". (Liao is also an abbreviation used for the city of Liaoyang.)

Sub-dialects

Yantai dialect
Dalian dialect
Weifang dialect
Weihai dialect
Dandong dialect
Qingdao dialect
Rizhao dialect

References

Dalian
Dandong
Mandarin Chinese
Qingdao
Weifang